Moniky Bancilon (born 1990) is a Brazilian team handball player. She plays on the Brazilian national team and RK Podravka Koprivnica, and participated at the 2011 World Women's Handball Championship in Brazil.

References

1990 births
Living people
Brazilian female handball players
Handball players at the 2011 Pan American Games
Pan American Games gold medalists for Brazil
Pan American Games medalists in handball
Medalists at the 2011 Pan American Games
RK Podravka Koprivnica players
21st-century Brazilian women